Highway M19 is a Ukrainian international highway (M-highway) that completely corresponds to whole length of European route E85 that runs through Ukraine. 

Crossing Western Ukraine from north to south, it connects the historical region Volhynia (border with Belarus) with Southern Bukovina (border of Romania).

Main route

Main route and connections to/intersections with other highways in Ukraine.

Gallery

See also

 Roads in Ukraine
 Ukraine Highways
 International E-road network
 Pan-European corridors

References

External links
 International Roads in Ukraine in Russian
 European Roads in Russian

Roads in Volyn Oblast
Roads in Rivne Oblast
Roads in Ternopil Oblast
Roads in Chernivtsi Oblast
European route E85